The FUFA Women Super League is among the top-flight women's domestic football league in Uganda which is sanctioned by the Federation of Uganda Football Associations.

In 2019, the Women Super League was introduced to the Ugandan women's football system with the FUFA Women Elite League re-organized as the second division under the Women Super League. The inaugural season of the Women Super League which started with 8 teams, abruptly ended in May 2020 due to the COVID-19 pandemic.

History
The league is the successor of the Elite Women Football League, which ran for five years. That league was played in regional groups that played play-offs for the championship afterwards.
The championship finals were:
2014–15: Kawempe 3-2 Buikwe  
2015–16: Kawempe Muslim 0-0 (4–2 pen) She Corporates
2016–17: Kawempe Muslim 4-0 UCU Cardinals
2017–18: Kawempe Muslim 1-0 Olila Women            
2018–19: UCU Lady Cardinals 2-0 Lady Dove

Clubs
Kawempe Muslim Women FC
Uganda Martyrs Lubaga
Lady Doves FC
She Corporates
UCU Lady Cardinals
Kampala Queens
Olila Women FC
Tooro Queens
SHE Maroons 
Rines SS

Champions
2019–20: abandoned
2020–21:
2021–22:She CORP

References

Women Super League
Uganda
Women's football in Uganda